Rossana Juncos (born 20 June 1958) is an Argentine former butterfly, freestyle and medley swimmer. She competed in six events at the 1976 Summer Olympics.

Personal life
Juncos is part of an Argentine Olympic swimming family. Her brother Luis Juncos and her sister-in-law Valentina Aracil (Luis' wife) represented Argentina at the 1984 and 1988 Summer Olympics, respectively. Her American-born niece Natalie Juncos (daughter of Luis and Valentina) is a member of the Argentina women's national football team.

References

External links
 

1958 births
Living people
Argentine female butterfly swimmers
Argentine female freestyle swimmers
Argentine female medley swimmers
Pan American Games competitors for Argentina
Swimmers at the 1979 Pan American Games
Olympic swimmers of Argentina
Swimmers at the 1976 Summer Olympics
Place of birth missing (living people)
20th-century Argentine women